Richard Malik (19 December 1909 – 20 January 1945) was a German international footballer. 

Drafted into the Wehrmacht he died on the Eastern Front of World War II.

His cousin Leonard Malik was also a footballer representing Poland before World War II.

References

1909 births
1945 deaths
Association football forwards
German footballers
Germany international footballers
German military personnel killed in World War II